Fred Jackson Jr. is a jazz fusion saxophonist and flautist who has recorded with  Bobby Hutcherson, Earth, Wind & Fire, Jimmy Smith, Horace Silver, and Solomon Burke.

Discography

As sideman
 Alice Coltrane, Eternity (Warner Bros., 1976)
 Andrae Crouch, Take Me Back (1975)
 Angela Bofill, Intuition (Capitol, 1988)
 B.B. King, King Size (ABC, 1977)
 Bill Cosby, Bill Cosby Is Not Himself These Days (Capitol, 1976)
 Billy Wright, Goin' Down Slow (Savoy, 1984)
 Bobby Hutcherson, Head On (Blue Note, 1971)
 Bobby Hutcherson, Montara (Blue Note, 1975)
 Boz Scaggs, Slow Dancer (Columbia, 1974)
 Carole King, Wrap Around Joy (Ode, 1974)
 Chuck Jackson, I Wanna Give You Some Love (EMI, 1980)
 Con Funk Shun, Spirit of Love (Mercury, 1980)
 Diane Schuur, Pure Schuur (GRP, 1991)
 Dynasty, Your Piece of the Rock (Solar, 1979)
 Earth, Wind & Fire, All 'n' All (Columbia, 1977)
 Earth, Wind & Fire, I Am (Columbia, 1979)
 Earth, Wind & Fire, Faces (Columbia, 1980)
 Edmund Sylvers, Have You Heard (Casablanca, 1980)
 Flora Purim, Nothing Will Be As It Was...Tomorrow (Warner Bros., 1977)
 Freda Payne, Supernatural High (Capitol, 1978)
 The Gap Band, The Gap Band (Mercury, 1979)
 Gene Harris, Nexus (Blue Note, 1975)
 Gladys Knight, Touch (Columbia, 1981)
 Grover Mitchell, Meet Grover Mitchell (Jazz Chronicles, 1979)
 Herbie Hancock, Sunlight (Columbia, 1978)
 Horace Silver, Silver 'n Wood (Blue Note, 1976)
 Jean Terrell, I Had to Fall in Love (A&M, 1978)
 Joe Sample, Rainbow Seeker (ABC, 1978)
 John Mayall, Moving On (Polydor, 1972)
 Jon Lucien, Premonition (Columbia, 1976)
 Lamont Dozier, Out Here On My Own (ABC, 1973)
 Lenny Williams, Spark of Love (ABC, 1978)
 Maria Muldaur, Sweet Harmony (Reprise, 1976)
 Marilyn McCoo & Billy Davis Jr., the Two of Us (ABC, 1977)
 Martha Reeves, We Meet Again (Fantasy, 1978)
 Mary Wells, In and Out of Love (Epic, 1981)
 Monk Higgins, Sheba Baby (Buddah 1975)
 The Mothers, The Grand Wazoo (Reprise, 1972)
 Miriam Makeba, A Promise (CBS 1974)
 Natalie Cole & Peabo Bryson, We're the Best of Friends (Capitol, 1979)
 Norman Connors, Romantic Journey (Buddah, 1977)
 Norman Connors, This Is Your Life (Arista, 1977)
 Rick James, Bustin' Out of L Seven (Gordy, 1979)
 Rick James, Throwin' Down (Gordy, 1982)
 Rockie Robbins, You and Me (A&M, 1980)
 Ry Cooder, Chicken Skin Music (Reprise, 1976)
 Shalamar, Three for Love (Solar, 1980)
 Shalamar, Big Fun (Solar, 1988)
 Sheena Easton, No Strings (MCA, 1993)
 Stevie Woods, The Woman in My Life (Ariola, 1982)
 Tavares, Love Uprising (Capitol, 1980)
 Tavares, Supercharged (Capitol, 1980)
 Terry Callier, Fire On Ice (Elektra, 1978)
 Vernon Burch, Steppin' Out (Chocolate City, 1980)
 Wade Marcus, Metamophosis  (ABC, 1976)
 Webster Lewis, Let Me Be the One (Epic, 1981)
 The Whispers, Whisper in Your Ear (Solar, 1979)
 The Whispers, Imagination (Solar, 1980)
 The Whispers, Love Is Where You Find It (Solar, 1981)
 Willie Hutch, Foxy Brown (Motown, 1974)

References

American jazz saxophonists
American male saxophonists
Jazz fusion musicians
Living people
1940s births
American jazz flautists
21st-century American saxophonists
21st-century American male musicians
American male jazz musicians
21st-century flautists